Cruel, Cruel Love is a 1914 American comedy silent film made at the Keystone Studios and starring Charlie Chaplin.

Plot 
Chaplin plays a character quite different from the Little Tramp for which he would become famous. In this short Keystone film, Chaplin is instead a rich, upper-class gentleman (Lord Helpus) whose romance is endangered when his girlfriend (played by Minta Durfee) sees him being embraced by her maid and jumps to the wrong conclusion.  She angrily sends Lord Helpus away, saying she never wants to see him again.  Distraught, when Lord Helpus arrives home he is determined to end his life.  He swallows what he thinks is a glass of poison and envisions himself being tortured in Hell.  Not long afterward, the girlfriend's gardener and maid explain to Minta that Lord Helpus was not flirting at all.  Minta quickly sends a note of apology to Lord Helpus.  upon reading it, Lord Helpus flies into a panic and summons an ambulance to help him before he dies from the fatal dose of poison.  There is no danger of Lord Helpus expiring: His butler had stealthily switched the liquid in the glass to harmless water.

Chaplin's romantic interest in this film, Minta Durfee, was the wife of fellow Keystone actor Roscoe "Fatty" Arbuckle.

Cast
 Charles Chaplin - Lord Helpus/Mr. Dovey
 Chester Conklin - Lord Helpus' Butler
 Minta Durfee - The Lady
 Eva Nelson - Maid

Preservation status
Cruel, Cruel Love was presumed to be a lost film for more than 50 years until a complete nitrate film copy in reasonable condition was discovered in South America. Restoration copies were made by David Shepard of Film Preservation Associates, and by Lobster Films of Paris, and its original two-reel format is available for sale.

Review
A reviewer from Motion Picture World wrote, "Slight in texture, but it makes a pleasing, laughable picture."

See also
List of rediscovered films
Charlie Chaplin filmography

References

External links

 
 
 Cruel, Cruel Love at SilentEra
 
 

1914 films
American black-and-white films
American silent short films
Films directed by George Nichols
Films directed by Mack Sennett
1914 comedy films
Films produced by Mack Sennett
Silent American comedy films
Articles containing video clips
1914 short films
1910s rediscovered films
American comedy short films
1910s American films